Ivar Olof Harald Hamrell (born 13 December 1960 in Uppsala, Sweden) is a Swedish actor, film director and screenwriter.

He is the son of Swedish mathematician Sonja Lyttkens.

Selected filmography
1975 – Pojken med guldbyxorna (TV)
1975 – Ungkarlshotellet (TV film)
1976 – The Man on the Roof
1981 – Operation Leo
1984 – Sköna juveler
1986 – Studierektorns sista strid (TV)
1987 – Nionde kompaniet
1988 – Mimmi (TV)
1989 – Täcknamn Coq Rouge
1990 – Storstad (director)
1993 – Snoken (TV) (even director)
1994 – Den vite riddaren (TV) (even director)
1996 – Sånt är livet
1996 – Vinterviken (even director and screenwriter)
1998 – Beck – Moneyman (director)
1998 – Beck – Monstret (director)
1997 – Emma åklagare (TV)
1999 – En häxa i familjen (director)
1999 – In Bed with Santa (screenwriter)
2001 – Beck – Mannen utan ansikte (director)
2002 – Beck – Sista vittnet (director)
2002 – Beck – Okänd avsändare (even director)
2003 – Ramona (even director)
2004 – Om Stig Petrés hemlighet (TV) (even director)
2006 – Beck – Flickan i jordkällaren (director)
2006 – Beck – Skarpt läge (director)
2007 – Beck – Det tysta skriket (director)
2007 – Beck – Den svaga länken (even director)
2008 – Livet i Fagervik (TV)
2009 – Beck – I stormens öga (director)
2010 – Kommissarie Späck
2010 – Beck – Levande begravd (director)
2011 – Arne Dahl: Misterioso
2012 – Real Humans (TV)

References

External links

http://www.filmdelta.se/names.php?personId=79897&prev_search=harald%20hamrell

Swedish film directors
Swedish male actors
Swedish screenwriters
Swedish male screenwriters
1960 births
Living people
People from Uppsala
20th-century Swedish people